Gerard Jones (born 24 June 1989) is an English professional football coach, having recently worked as Head of Coaching at Bristol Rovers F.C. and as an Elite Coach Educator with the Royal Moroccan Football Federation. Jones is a former youth team player at Halifax Town A.F.C., and award-winning entrepreneur having set up a football coaching business in early 2009, which he later grew into becoming recognized among the Top 100 Best Business Start-ups in the UK in 2010 by Startups.co.uk.

With over 14 years experience coaching in the U.K., U.S., Italy, Norway, Morocco and New Zealand,  his previous roles include being a Director of Coaching in the U.S., having also worked as a Director of Coaching at Arsenal Soccer Schools, U21s Assistant Coach at Bradford City A.F.C., an Academy Coach at Rochdale A.F.C. and a former Manager (association football) at Eccleshill United F.C.

Since leaving Bristol Rovers in 2018, Jones joined United States Soccer Federation as a nationally licensed Instructor, having been identified by USSF to deliver nationally accredited coach education courses which include their 4v4, 7v7, 9v9 and 11v11 In-Person Courses and National D Licence courses through Eastern New York State Soccer Association. As a published author in communication psychology through the use of Game-calls, Jones has presented at several coaching conferences and events, which includes as a Guest Presenter at the Kentucky Youth Soccer Association "Soccer Learning University" conference in 2020, one of the United States Soccer Federation State Soccer Association sharing insight into his 4-Cs Coaching Approach which guides his coaching philosophy.

Jones joined the Royal Moroccan Football Federation recruited by Osian Roberts as an Elite Coach Educator (Formateur des Entraîneurs) in Feb 2020. 

He is currently a Director of Coaching at Major League Soccer Sporting Kansas City.

Coaching career

Jones started his coaching career in schools and community programs, later going on to launch his own coaching business Gerard School of Football. He then coached at various non-league youth and reserve teams, alongside college and university programs, and later became an Academy Coach at Rochdale A.F.C and First Team Manager at Eccleshill United F.C.

In March 2016, Jones left England and his role with Bradford City A.F.C. where he was the Assistant U21s Coach through American collegiate soccer academy RIASA, to become the Director of Coaching at Eastside F.C. in Michigan.

June 2017, Bristol Rovers F.C. announced Jones as Head of Academy Coaching, responsible for the development of the Academy coaching program and coach development across all ages, working with the Academy Manager and Phase Lead Coaches to enhance the efficiency of their programs.

In 2011, Jones was listed among the Top 50 brightest and most talented people in the North of England, and in 2014 was also awarded the Junior Chamber International U.K. Ten Outstanding Young Persons (TOYP) award for his entrepreneurial success and creation of coaching programs with Gerard School of Football.

Alongside coaching, Jones is also a published author with his book titled: Let's Talk Soccer.

Jones holds the FA UEFA A Licence and FA Advanced Youth Award (12–16) alongside a master's degree in Performance Coaching. He is also studying a PhD in augmented feedback related to how coaches can use verbal feedback in football within a constraints-led approach to guide the visual search of the football player, in order to improve player's learning and performance.

Jones is studying a PhD at Sheffield Hallam University alongside creating a digital tech-startup providing online coach education for coaches, which has already received support from NatWest via their Entrepreneur Accelerator programme and the University of Cambridge's Impulse Programme for High Tech Innovation.

Jones is also a Nationally Licensed Instructor for United States Soccer Federation.

In early 2020, Jones joined the Royal Moroccan Football Federation as an Elite Coach Educator under the direction of then National Technical Director Osian Roberts.

He later joined MLS Sporting Kansas City in early 2022 as a Director of Coaching.

References

Further reading
 

1989 births
Living people
Association football executives
Bristol Rovers F.C. non-playing staff
Rochdale A.F.C. non-playing staff
Bradford City A.F.C. non-playing staff
RIASA managers
English football managers